The Lady with the Tiger Skin (German: Die Dame mit dem Tigerfell) is a 1927 German silent film directed by Willi Wolff and starting Ellen Richter, Mary Kid and Georg Alexander.

The film's art direction is by Ernst Stern.

Cast
Ellen Richter as Lady Portin, alias Ellen Garet
Mary Kid
Georg Alexander as Lord Abbot
Bruno Kastner as Count Charles Bremer
Heinrich Schroth as Henry Seymor
Alfred Gerasch as Senior Santos
Kurt Gerron as Meyers
Evi Eva

References

External links

Films of the Weimar Republic
Films directed by Willi Wolff
German silent feature films
Films based on Austrian novels
UFA GmbH films
German black-and-white films